Hammarskjold in a Swedish surname.  Notable persons with that name include:
 Emilie Hammarskjöld Swedish composer, singer, pianist, and music teacher
 Peder Mikaelsson Hammarskjöld (c. 1560–1646), Swedish soldier
 Lorenzo Hammarsköld (1785–1827), Swedish author
 Emilie Hammarskjöld (1821–1854), Swedish-American composer, singer, pianist, music teacher and organist, wife of Peder Hjalmar from the Skultana branch
 Carl Hammarskjöld (1838–1898), Minister of Education for Sweden (1880– 1888)
 Hugo Hammarskjöld (1845–1937), Minister of Education for Sweden (1906–1909), brother of Carl
 Hjalmar Hammarskjöld (1862–1953), Prime Minister of Sweden (1914–1917), cousin of Carl and Hugo
 Carl Gustaf Hammarskjöld (1865–1940), Secretary of Defense for Sweden (1920–1921), brother of Hjalmar and cousin of Carl and Hugo
 Ludvig Hammarskiöld (1869–1949), Swedish general, cousin of Hjalmar
 Bo Hammarskjöld (1891–1974), Governor of Södermanland (1935–1958) and State Secretary for Sweden, son of Hjalmar
 Åke Hammarskjöld (1893–1937), Swedish civil servant and diplomat, son of Hjalmar, brother of Bo and Dag
 Dag Hammarskjöld (1905–1961), Secretary-General of the United Nations, son of Hjalmar and brother of Åke and Bo
 Lennart Hammarskiöld (1912–1974), Swedish banker, son of Ludvig
 Hans Hammarskiöld (1925–2012), Swedish photographer

See also
 Hammarskjöld family